She Loves Me, She Loves Me Not is the sole studio album by American hardcore punk band Kiss It Goodbye, released on April 1, 1997 though Revelation Records. The album was repressed on vinyl format in 2012 to celebrate the band's short 2012 reunion tour.

It was listed as the 17th Terrorizer 'Albums Of The Year' in 1997, and 13th in CMJ's 'Metal Top 25' for July 1997.

Track listing

Personnel
 Tim Singer - vocals, layout
 Keith Huckins – guitar
 Thom Rusnack – bass
 Andrew Gormley – drums
 Demain Johnston - artwork
 Billy Anderson - production, engineering
 Floyd Reitsman - engineering
 Jeff Job - engineering
 George Horn - mastering

References

External links
 

Kiss It Goodbye albums
1997 debut albums
Revelation Records albums
Albums produced by Billy Anderson (producer)